The 1988–89 New York Islanders season was the 17th season for the franchise in the National Hockey League (NHL). It saw the Islanders finish in last place in the Patrick Division with a record of 28 wins, 47 losses, and 5 ties for 61 points. They missed the Stanley Cup playoffs for the first time in 15 seasons.

Regular season

Final standings

Schedule and results

Playoffs

In 1988–89, the Islanders failed to qualify for the Stanley Cup Playoffs for the first time since the 1973–74 season. This broke a streak of 14 consecutive playoff appearances for the team, which included four straight Stanley Cup championships from 1980 to 1983.

Player statistics

Forwards
Note: GP= Games played; G= Goals; AST= Assists; PTS = Points; PIM = Points

Defencemen
Note: GP= Games played; G= Goals; AST= Assists; PTS = Points; PIM = Points

Goaltending
Note: GP= Games played; W= Wins; L= Losses; T = Ties; SO = Shutouts; GAA = Goals Against

Awards and records
 Bryan Trottier, King Clancy Memorial Trophy
 David Volek, Wing, NHL 1st All-Rookie Team

Transactions

Draft picks
New York's draft picks at the 1988 NHL Entry Draft held at the Montreal Forum in Montreal, Quebec.

Farm teams

References

New York Islanders seasons
New York Islanders
New York Islanders
New York Islanders
New York Islanders